Alessandro Malaguti (born 22 September 1987) is an Italian former professional road bicycle racer, who rode professionally between 2011 and 2016 for the , , ,  and  teams.

Career
Born in Forlì, Malaguti competed as a professional from 2011, when he joined the  team. He spent one season with the team, winning a stage of the Vuelta del Uruguay, before he joined  for the 2012 season. Again, he left the team after one season, and joined  for the 2013 season. Malaguti took the first European victory of his professional career in March 2013, when he won the 1.1-rated Route Adélie race, the fourth round of the French Road Cycling Cup. Malaguti was the fastest finisher out of a group of sixteen riders who battled for victory in a sprint finish, in Vitré.

For the 2014 season, Malaguti joined .

Major results

2008
 1st Coppa del Mobilio
 2nd GP Folignano
 2nd Gran Premio Città di Foligno
 3rd Coppa Caduti
 4th Coppa Comune di Castelfranco
 5th Memorial Caucci Alberto
 5th Trofeo e Gran Premio Banca di Credito Cooperativo del Metauro
 6th Gran Premio della Liberazione
 8th Trofeo Città di Castelfidardo
 10th Giro del Cigno
2009
 1st Gran Premio San Giuseppe
 2nd Gran Premio Camon
 3rd Giro del Cigno
 5th Coppa Caduti di Reda
 6th Gran Premio della Liberazione
 10th Trofeo Cibes
2010
 2nd Coppa Festa in Fiera San Salvatore
 3rd Coppa Caivano
 3rd Trofeo Memorial Secondo Marziali
 4th Trofeo Maria SS Addolorata
 6th Targa Crocifisso
 6th Memorial Matteo Radicchi
 7th G.P. Città di Montegranaro
 9th GP Industria Commercio e Artigianato di San Giovanni Valdarno
 10th Trofeo Città di Lastra a Signa
2011
 4th Overall Vuelta del Uruguay
1st Stage 5
2013
 1st Route Adélie
 8th Gran Premio Bruno Beghelli
 9th Circuito de Getxo
 9th Tour de Vendée
2014
 2nd Overall Tour de Hokkaido
1st  Mountains classification
1st Stage 1
2016
 3rd Overall Tour du Maroc
 5th Tour of Almaty
 10th Tour de Berne

References

External links
 
 
 

Italian male cyclists
1987 births
Living people
People from Forlì
Cyclists from Emilia-Romagna
Sportspeople from the Province of Forlì-Cesena